Wielgosz is a Polish surname. Notable people with the surname include:

 Anna Wielgosz (born 1993), Polish middle-distance runner
 Renata Wielgosz, Canadian ambassador

See also
 

Polish-language surnames